Magleby may refer to:

Magleby (surname)
Magleby Church, a church in the village of Magleby in the east of Møn, Denmark

See also
Store Magleby, a Danish town